Eggert Gilfer (12 February 1892 – 24 March 1960) was an Icelandic chess player, seven-times Icelandic Chess Championship winner (1918, 1920, 1925, 1927, 1929, 1935, 1942).

Biography
From the late 1910s to mid-1950s, Eggert Gilfer was one of the leading Icelandic chess players. He seven times won the Icelandic Chess Championship between 1918 and 1942.

Eggert Gilfer played for Iceland in the Chess Olympiads:
 In 1930, at first board in the 3rd Chess Olympiad in Hamburg (+5, =2, -10),
 In 1933, at second board in the 5th Chess Olympiad in Folkestone (+4, =3, -7),
 In 1937, at first board in the 7th Chess Olympiad in Stockholm (+1, =4, -10),
 In 1952, at first board in the 10th Chess Olympiad in Helsinki (+1, =2, -5).

Eggert Gilfer played for Iceland in the unofficial Chess Olympiad:
 In 1936, at first board in the 3rd unofficial Chess Olympiad in Munich (+4, =6, -9).

References

External links

Eggert Gilfer chess games at 365chess.com

1892 births
1960 deaths
People from Keflavík
Icelandic chess players
Chess Olympiad competitors
20th-century chess players